Paratrirhithrum nitobae is a species of tephritid or fruit flies in the genus Paratrirhithrum of the family Tephritidae.

References

Dacinae